Josué Emmanuel Reyes Santacruz (born 10 December 1997) is a Mexican professional footballer who plays as a centre-back for Liga de Expansión MX club Sonora.

Career statistics

Club

Honours
Cruz Azul
Liga MX: Guardianes 2021
Leagues Cup: 2019
Campeón de Campeones: 2021

References

External links
Josué Reyes at Soccerway 
Josué Reyes at Official Liga MX Profile

1997 births
Living people
Association football defenders
Cruz Azul footballers
Footballers from Sonora
Mexican footballers